Clarence Earl Chapman (born December 10, 1953) is a former American football cornerback in the National Football League (NFL). He was drafted by the Oakland Raiders in the seventh round of the 1976 NFL Draft. He played college football at Eastern Michigan.

Chapman also played for the New Orleans Saints, Cincinnati Bengals and Detroit Lions.

1953 births
Living people
American football cornerbacks
Eastern Michigan Eagles football players
Oakland Raiders players
New Orleans Saints players
Cincinnati Bengals players
Detroit Lions players
Michigan Panthers players
Players of American football from Detroit